Object Desktop (OD; previously the Object Desktop Network or ODNT) is an online software subscription service created by Stardock for OS/2 and relaunched for Windows in 1997.

Object Desktop includes most graphical user interface customization and productivity products offered by Stardock, including WindowBlinds, Fences, DesktopX, Tweak7, IconPackager and ObjectBar.

History

OS/2 (1993 to 2001)
Object Desktop — initially entitled The Workplace Toolset/2 — was developed over three years by Brad Wardell and Kurt Westerfeld subsequent to Stardock's OS/2 Essentials, a pre-registered set of OS/2 shareware. Object Desktop 1.0 was followed by 1.5 and Professional versions following in short order.

By 1997 the OS/2 ISV market was flagging, and many customers were switching to Windows NT 4. 1997 OS/2 revenues were 33% of those in 1996, and they fell to 25% of 1996 levels in 1998. This led to their decision to switch to Windows in mid-1997. Nevertheless, Stardock remained an OS/2 ISV until February 2001, when they stopped selling Object Desktop for OS/2.

OS/2 versions were sold as initial versions and upgrades, costing more than later Windows versions due to lower volume of sales.

Object Desktop 1.0
The initial release of Object Desktop was both praised for its functionality and criticised for performance and compatibility issues.

Object Desktop 1.5
Object Desktop 1.5 was released on 2 May 1996, fixing many problems, and adding the following components:

Users of 1.0 could upgrade for $37.

Object Desktop Professional
Object Desktop Professional was (as the name suggests) aimed at professional users of OS/2. It was released on 24 August 1996, priced at $179; users could also upgrade from OD 1.5 for $69.95, or from OD 1.0 for $119.

In addition to the features of OD 1.5, the package included:

Object Desktop 2.0
Object Desktop 2.0 was an update to all previously released components, and an integration of the Professional features into the main package. It was priced at $99.95; users of Object Desktop Professional could upgrade for $39, while other versions could be upgraded for $69.95.

An upgrade to 2.02 was released at the start of 2000, but it was made clear that it would be the last release.

Windows (1997 onwards)

Early Experience Program
When it became clear that OS/2 would not remain a viable platform, Stardock decided to move to Windows. This required rewriting old components and writing new ones to replace those which were not appropriate for Windows. This would take time, but Stardock needed money immediately to sustain development.

To cope with this cashflow problem, Object Desktop users who had switched from OS/2 to Windows were asked to purchase Windows subscriptions in advance of the actual software, on the understanding that their subscription period would only begin when the software was reasonably complete (which ended up as December 1999). This program was called the Early Experience Program. Due to significant goodwill built up over the previous years, many signed up, and Stardock survived.

Changes in focus
Initially the new Object Desktop package was closely related to the OS/2 versions, with old favourites like Object Edit, Control Center and Task/Tab Launchpad being ported over. However, as the userbase expanded from its traditional core of technical users into the wider Windows market, newer components shifted to focus on customizing the graphical user interface. The flagship component of Object Desktop became WindowBlinds; other popular additions were IconPackager, ObjectBar, DesktopX, DeskScapes and Fences.

Operation and pricing
Impulse (preceded by Component Manager and Stardock Central) is the main interface for registering, downloading and updating components. It is roughly equivalent to a package manager.

Users pay an initial fee for access to the software and one year of access to download updates. They may also download new components added during their subscription period. Updates are not guaranteed; components deemed less relevant may be passed over, or removed.

After expiry, users cannot download any software until they renew; however, they do not lose the use of released (non-beta) software that is already downloaded, nor is it necessary to renew immediately. Renewals add a year of access from the date of renewal, not the expiry date.

Historically, the initial subscription fee for the Windows version of Object Desktop has been $49.95, while a year's renewal or an upgrade from a standalone component has been $34.95. Object Desktop 2008 introduced two tiers, with the lower tier at $49.95 and the higher tier at $69.95, but the latter was eliminated in 2010.

Components 
Object Desktop works on a component model; many of its programs are available separately, but subscribers can use all of them.

Current components
These components are available to all Object Desktop subscribers as of February 2010:

Obsolete components
These components may remain available for some legacy subscribers, but are not offered to new users:

Retired Windows components

These components have been withdrawn from service or did not make it past the beta stages:

Retired OS/2 Components
These components were not brought forth to the Windows version of Object Desktop:

Criticism
An occasional complaint with the subscription model is that a subscriber's favourite component has not been updated recently, or may be left in beta for a long time. On the other hand, popular components such as WindowBlinds tend to be frequently updated, with beta releases every week or two, release versions with new features every few months, and major version changes every year or so.

Some non-Object Desktop users have said the beta issue creates a double standard and forces people to upgrade to Object Desktop in order to get the latest features, while Stardock says that the policy is due to too many standalone users expecting beta versions to have the same reliability as release versions, and the increased ease of releasing a build on Impulse over a separate installation package.

References

Object Desktop, a history
Stardock's OS/2 history
10 years of Stardock/Stardock's 10-year Anniversary

External links
Object Desktop website

OS/2 software
Windows Internet software
Desktop environments
Stardock software